Mường La is a rural district of Sơn La province in the Northwest region of Vietnam. As of 2003, the district had a population of 74,668. The district covers an area of 1,408 km². The district capital lies at Ít Ong.

References

Districts of Sơn La province
Sơn La province